Sri Siddhartha Gautama (ශ්‍රී සිද්ධාර්ථ ගෞතම) is a 2013 Sinhalese epic biographical film based on the life of the Buddha. Directed by Saman Weeraman Written by, Dr Edwin Ariyadasa, Saman Weersman, Navin Gunarathne and George Paldona.

Starring by Gagan Malik, Anchal Singh, Ranjan Ramanayake, Anjani Perera, Roshan Ranawana, Gautam Gulati, Saranga Disasekara, Dilhani Ekanayake, and Wilson Gooneratne. Veteran film maker Chandran Rutnam was the main adviser to the project. The film was released in Sri Lanka on 24 January 2013 on EAP theaters. The film has been dubbed into many languages such as in Mandarin, Thai, Vietnamese and Hindi. It has also been subtitled in French, Japanese, Vietnamese, Mandarin and Hindi.

The film received five of the eight awards presented at 2014 UN Vesak Buddhist Film festival in Hanoi, Vietnam including the Best Featured film, Best Actor award, Best Director award, Best Editor award and Best Music award.

Cast 
 Gagan Malik as Prince Siddhartha
 Anchal Singh as Princess Yasodhara
 Ranjan Ramanayake as King Suddhodana
 Jeewan Kumaranatunga as King Bimbisara
 Anshu Malik as Queen Maya
 Roshan Ranawana as Prince Nanda
 Gautam Gulati as Prince Devadatta
 Saranga Disasekara as Channa Prince Siddhartha's favorite servant and classmate
 Wilson Gunarathne as Asita Thapasa
 Buddhadasa Vithanarachchi as Prince Siddhartha's Guru Vishma Mitra
 Douglas Ranasinghe as King Suppabuddha
 Dilhani Perera as Queen Pramitha
 Anjani Perera as Queen Prajapathi
 Ranjith Jayasinghe as Kondangngna
 Edwin Ariyadasa as Rama Thapasa
 Oshadhi Hewamadduma as Sujatha
 Dushyanth Weeraman as Prince Pasenadi
 Nalaka Daluwatte as Price Rohana
 Kelum Premasara as Uddaka Rāmaputta

Voice cast 
 Chirantha Ranwala voiced for Prince Siddhartha.
 Kumari Seneviratne voiced for Princess Yasodhara.
 Purnika Peries voiced for Queen Maya.
 Tharaka Jayathilaka voiced for Maha Pajapati.
 Susantha Priyadarshana voiced for Prince Devadatta.

References

External links 
 Sri Siddhartha The Buddha
 
ශ්‍රී සිද්ධාර්ථ ගෞතම විශිෂ්ට චිත්‍රපටයකැයි මා කියන්නේ නැහැ

2010s Sinhala-language films
2013 films
Films about Gautama Buddha